= Rádio – Top 100 =

Rádio – Top 100 may refer to:

- Rádio – Top 100 (Czech Republic)
- Rádio – Top 100 (Slovakia)
